Singa may refer to:

Places

 Singa (Haida village), a historical village on Haida Gwaii, British Columbia, Canada
 Singa, Estonia, a village in Mõniste Parish, Võru County
 Singa, Nepal
 Singa District, Huamalíes Province, Peru
 Singa, Peru, a village and capital of the district
 Singa, Sudan, a town
A village in the Kumbugu district of Ghana

Other uses
 Singa, a common transliteration of the name of Nzinga of Ndongo and Matamba  (c. 1583 – 1663)
 Singa (spider), a genus of spiders
 Singa (mythology), a mythical creature of the Batak people of Sumatra, Indonesia
 Singa the Lion, the mascot for the National Courtesy Campaign in Singapore
 Singa clan, an ethnic group of 15th century Rwanda

See also
Singha, a beer brand